The Glaciarium was the world's first mechanically frozen ice rink and was located in London, England. An item in the 8 June 1844 issue of Littell's Living Age headed "The Glaciarium" reported:

A later rink was opened by John Gamgee in a tent in a small building just off the Kings Road in Chelsea, London, on 7 January 1876.  In March, it moved to a permanent venue at 379 Kings Road, where a rink measuring 40 by 24 feet was established.

The rink was based on a concrete surface, with layers of earth, cow hair and timber planks.  Atop these were laid oval copper pipes carrying a solution of glycerine with ether, nitrogen peroxide, and water.  The pipes were covered by water and the solution was pumped through, freezing the water into ice.  Gamgee had discovered the process while attempting to develop a method to freeze meat for import from Australia and New Zealand, and had patented it as early as 1870.

Gamgee operated the rink on a membership-only basis and attempted to attract a wealthy clientele, experienced in open-air ice skating during winters in the Alps.  He installed an orchestra gallery, which could also be used by spectators, and decorated the walls with views of the Swiss Alps.

The rink initially proved a success, and Gamgee opened two further rinks later in the year: at Rusholme in Manchester and the "Floating Glaciarium" at Charing Cross in London, this last significantly larger at 115 by 25 feet.  However, the process was expensive, and mists rising from the ice deterred customers, forcing Gamgee to close the Glaciarium by the end of the year, and all his rinks had shut by mid-1878.  However, the Southport Glaciarium opened in 1879, using Gamgee's method.

See also
 St. Nicholas Rink

References

Winter sports
Former buildings and structures in the Royal Borough of Kensington and Chelsea
Sports venues in London